The Fiji Women's Pro 2015 was an event of the Association of Surfing Professionals for 2015 ASP World Tour.

This event was held from 01 to 5 June at Namotu, (Tavarua, Fiji) and opposed by 36 surfers.

The tournament was won by Sally Fitzgibbons (AUS), who beat B. Buitendag (ZAF) in final.

Round 1

Round 2

Round 3

Round 4

Quarter finals

Semi finals

Final

References

2015 World Surf League
Fiji Pro
2015 in Fijian sport
Surfing in Fiji
Women's surfing
June 2015 sports events in Oceania